Everyday Life is the first solo album by rapper Life MC of the British hip hop group Phi Life Cypher. The album was produced by fellow Phi Life Cypher member DJ Nappa, and was released on 24 March 2003.

"In Memory" is dedicated to the memory of Stephen Lawrence.

"Time Crisis" uses a sample from "Montagues and Capulets" from the 1935 ballet Romeo and Juliet.

Track listing

References

2003 debut albums
Life (rapper) albums